Estoloides leucosticta is a species of beetle in the family Cerambycidae. It was described by Bates in 1885. It is known from Mexico.

References

Estoloides
Beetles described in 1885